Walker Creek is a northwest-flowing stream in western Marin County, California, United States.  It originates at the confluence of Salmon Creek and Arroyo Sausal and empties into Tomales Bay south of Dillon Beach, California.

History
Walker Creek is named for an early landowner in the area, Lewis W. Walker.

Chileno Creek is named for Chilean immigrants who settled the Chileno Valley, with encouragement from Adrian Godoy.

Keys Creek is named for Irish settler John Keyes, who settled on the creek in 1849 and used this once-important waterway to transport agricultural produce to San Francisco.

Watershed and course
The Walker Creek mainstem is formed by the confluence of Arroyo Sausal and Salmon Creek.

This reservoir was constructed in 1968 in Arroyo Sausal and is managed by the Marin Municipal Water District (MMWD).

The California Office of Environmental Health Hazard Assessment has issued a safe eating advisory for any fish caught in Soulajule Reservoir due to elevated levels of mercury and PCBs.

From here Arroyo Sausal joins Walker Creek at elevation  at Marshall-Petaluma Road.

Salmon Creek was described historically as a salmon and steelhead trout (Oncorhynchus mykiss) spawning and nursery area, although it has been seriously damaged by poor farming practices, dairy pollution and soil erosion.

From the confluence of Arroyo Sausal and Salmon Creek, Walker Creek descends to the northwest, paralleling Marshall-Petaluma Road as it curves westward. At the mouth of Verde Canyon, the creek crosses under the road and turns northwest, passing the mouth of Frink Canyon to a confluence with Chileno Creek.

From the Chileno Creek confluence, Walker Creek meanders westward, passing south of the town of Tomales, California. It crosses under Highway 1 at milepost 44.45 and is immediately joined by Keys Creek, entering from the north.

Below Keys Creek, Walker Creek continues southward along the Highway 1 to enter Tomales Bay just east of Preston Point.

Ecology
In the early 1900s, coho salmon (Oncorhynchus kisutch) were abundant in Walker Creek, but were nearly extirpated apparently due to severe erosion and siltation secondary to potato farming, overgrazing and logging operations. In 1975 D. W. Kelley performed a comprehensive investigation of steelhead trout (Oncorhynchus mykiss) and coho salmon populations. He found small numbers of steelhead young-of-the-year in all viable habitat areas in the watershed, but only eight coho near the confluence of Chileno and Walker Creek. In addition, the Soulajule Reservoir dam blocked all anadromous salmonid fish migration to Arroyo Sausal. California Department of Fish and Game (CDFG) began planting coho salmon from Olema Creek into Walker Creek in 2003 with modest success. In 2008 and again in 2013 coho returned to Walker Creek, Salmon Creek and Frink Canyon. Fishing for steelhead is open only below Highway 1.

Portions of Keyes Creek immediately downstream of the present Highway One bridge were once navigable and used to ship locally-grown potatoes by barge to San Francisco. The current small size of the channel at this location, more suitable for a canoe than a barge, is dramatic evidence of siltation due to erosive agricultural practices(potato farming) in the Walker Creek watershed over the past 150 years.

Mercury was mined at several sites in the Walker Creek watershed through the 1960s and early 1970s including the Gambonini, Chileno Valley, Franciscan and Cycle mines. Soulajule Reservoir, built after a severe drought in 1976–1977 inundated the Franciscan and Cycle mines and a tailings pile. The largest mine, at the Gambonini Ranch near the confluence of Salmon Creek and mainstem Walker Creek, closed in 1970.

See also
 Tomales Bay

References

External links
 Tomales Bay Watershed web page of Marin County Watershed Program 

Rivers of Marin County, California
Rivers of Northern California